Peter Fossett (June 6, 1815 – January 1901) was an enslaved laborer at Monticello, Thomas Jefferson's plantation, who after he attained his freedom in the mid-1800s, settled in Cincinnati where he established himself as a minister and caterer. He was a captain in the Black Brigade of Cincinnati during the Civil War. Fossett was an activist for education and prison reform. He was a conductor on the Underground Railroad. His remembrances, Once the slave of Thomas Jefferson, were published in 1898.

His wife, Sarah M. Fossett, was active in the church and Underground Railroad as well, but she was also noteworthy in her own right. Trained by a French specialist in New Orleans, she was a hairdresser to the elite women of Cincinnati's society. She was brought to Cincinnati by Abraham Evan Gwynne, the father of Alice Claypoole Vanderbilt. In 1860, she filed a suit after being denied passage on a streetcar, which resulted in the desegregation of streetcars in the city for African-American women. For twenty-five years, she was the manager of the Colored Orphans Asylum in Cincinnati.

Early life
Peter Farley Fossett was born into slavery at Monticello, near Charlottesville, Virginia, on June 6, 1815. His parents were Edith Hern Fossett and Joseph Fossett. Edith was the head cook at Monticello and Joseph was a blacksmith. Slaves did not generally receive pay at Monticello, but as a manager of the blacksmith shop, Joseph received a percentage of the shop's profits.

Unlike most slaves who were field laborers, he learned to read and write and had less physically demanding work. He assisted his parents in their work and worked as a house servant, for which he sometimes received tips. Jefferson allowed children of slaves to be educated with his grandchildren, according to Fossett. Lewis Randolph, Jefferson's grandson, was his teacher.

His grandmother was Mary Hemings Bell, who lived in Charlottesville. She provided nicer clothes than other slaves received at Monticello. He was the great grandson of Betty Hemings.

Slavery

Fossett was a slave at Monticello. Following Jefferson's death, an auction was held in January 1827 to sell Monticello's slaves. Peter, seven of his siblings, and his mother were put up for sale. His father was one of five people who had been freed by Jefferson in his will.

Eleven-year old Peter was put on the auction block, feeling like he was sold like a horse. He was purchased by Colonel John Jones who ran his plantation differently than Jefferson. At Monticello he had learned to read and write. Under threat of whippings, Peter continued these practices, and taught fellow slaves to read and write, but hid those activities. Catching Fossett reading a book once, Jones threw the book in the fire and said, "If I ever catch you with a book in your hands, thirty-and-nine lashes on your bare back." His father gave him a copy book so that he could write. Fossett forged papers for fugitive slaves so that it would appear that they were free.

Although Jones was brutal to Fossett, his wife, considered him a member of the family. Mrs. Jones offered lodging to preachers of any faith who traveled through the area, who made an impression on Fossett. Jones also came to care for Fossett. He ran away two times from Jones' estate, but was recaptured both times. At the time, he felt like he was going to become a free man, or die trying. The second escape resulted in Fossett being taken to jail and then sold on the auction block. Joseph, who moved to Ohio about 1840, and moved to Cincinnati about 1843, made trips to Virginia to see his family. He worked to buy his family out of slavery, but Peter's owner, John Jones, would not sell him until the second time he escaped. He was put on the auction block in 1850. At age 35, he was purchased and freed through the efforts of his father, family, and Jefferson's friends.

Career and community activism

After he was freed, he moved to Cincinnati, Ohio to be with his family. He held several jobs when he first arrived in Ohio, he worked as a waiter for a caterer and was a whitewasher. He became a caterer, working with his brother William and in the 1870s he opened his own catering business. His clients were among the elite of Cincinnati. Ohio History Center states: "There is reason to believe that he excelled at French cooking, as his mother received extensive training in this form of food preparation while a slave at Monticello."

He was a conductor on the Underground Railroad, supporting the efforts of Levi Coffin, who commended him for his "zealous efforts" to aid people to freedom. Coffin was known as "president of the Underground Railroad" for his efforts. Although Ohio was not a slave state, the Underground Railroad led many to Canada to be safer from capture and some stayed in Ohio in African-American communities. Conductors risked their lives when they brought fugitive slaves into their homes and helped them to the next stop on the railroad. John Parker brought people across the Ohio River by boat.

Fossett lobbied for prison reform and sat on the school system's board of directors. The school system was segregated at that time.

When he arrived in Cincinnati, Fossett joined the Union Baptist Church and was a trustee and clerk. He was ordained as a minister in 1870 and formed his own church, the construction of which was paid in large part by Fossett. He was a pastor for 25 years of that church, which came to be called the First Baptist Church in Cumminsville, Ohio. He was a pastor in total for 32 years. He ministered to African-American people across the country.

He wrote his remembrances in the book Once the slave of Thomas Jefferson in 1898.

Military

Captain Peter Fossett served with a unit of African Americans called the Black Brigade of Cincinnati. They built defences for the city along the Ohio River during the Civil War (1861–1865).

Marriage and children
Fossett married Sarah Mayrant, who was born in Charleston, South Carolina in 1826. Her parents were Judith and Rufus Morant (or Mayrant). Abraham Evan Gwynne, the father of Alice Claypoole Vanderbilt (1845 – 1934), brought Sarah to Cincinnati, where she was introduced to wealthy elite members of Cincinnati society. As a young girl, she was trained to care for hair by a French specialist in New Orleans. When she came to Cincinnati, she was a hairdresser for wealthy white women. "Through their influence she secured entry in its exclusive group and had no superior in her profession," as quoted in The History of Black Business in America.

She arrived in Cincinnati by 1854 when she married Peter Fossett. Like her husband, she was active in the community, including the First Baptist Church of Cumminsville, orphanages in Cincinnati, and assisting enslaved people on the Underground Railroad. She was the manager of the Colored Orphan Asylum for more than 25 years. The Fossetts lived in a "comfortable, well furnished and well provided home" in Cincinnati. They had four children, only one of whom survived to adulthood. Their married daughter's name was Martha "Mattie" E. Kelly.

In 1860 she protested when she was not allowed to board a streetcar in 1860, and her efforts led to African-American women being allowed to ride Cincinnati's streetcars. When a white conductor did not allow her to ride the streetcar, she sued the streetcar company and won a favorable ruling. It was several years before African-American men were allowed to ride the city's streetcars. Fossett died in December 1906.

Death
In 1900, believing that he was not going to live much longer, he traveled to Monticello with the help of friends, where he was allowed to stay as long as he wished. Fossett said it had seemed like an "earthly paradise" in his boyhood. After two weeks of an age-related illness, Fossett died in early January 1901. He was believed to be the last surviving slave from Monticello.

See also
 National Underground Railroad Freedom Center, Cincinnati

Notes

References

Further reading

External links
 Martha Fletcher remembers her mother talking about Rev. Peter Fossett’s reputation in Cincinnati. (video)
 Once the slave of Thomas Jefferson, Peter Fossett, 1898

1815 births
1901 deaths
19th-century American slaves
19th-century Baptist ministers from the United States
African-American abolitionists
African-American Baptist ministers
African-American history in Cincinnati
African Americans in the American Civil War
Baptist abolitionists
Hemings family
History of slavery in Virginia
People from Monticello
People who wrote slave narratives
Religious leaders from Cincinnati
Underground Railroad people